Evelyn Selbie (July 6, 1871 – December 7, 1950) was an American stage actress and performer in both silent and sound films.

Biography
Born in Louisville, Kentucky, as a young woman Selbie was a sidesaddle rider. She had a career which lasted twenty-five years on the stage. She began in Proctor's stock companies in New York after leaving her home. She acted in plays like Human Hearts and The Cat and the Canary. In the former production she starred for two seasons. Selbie also acted in the stock theater company that operated at the Grand Theater in Reno, Nevada. Then she ventured west where she tenured 18 months at the old Central Theatre in San Francisco, California. This was followed by a season in stock in San Diego, California and then a long one in Alaska with T.D. Frawley. During the Alaska tour Evelyn alternated leads with Virginia Thornton.

In 1909, Selbie joined a vaudeville team, leaving the Bentley stock company.

Selbie began her motion picture career in 1912 with the Essanay Company as the leading lady of Broncho Billy Anderson and worked with that company nine years. Her silent movie credits include The Squaw Man, which was the first Hollywood production of Cecil B. De Mille. She continued in motion pictures until 1949 with The Doolins of Oklahoma, in which she played Birdie. She participated in the Fu Manchu film serials and did freelance work on radio.

On December 7, 1950, Selbie died at the Motion Picture Country Hospital in Los Angeles, California. She was 79. Selbie entered the Motion Picture Country Hospital two weeks after suffering a heart attack. The interment was at Inglewood Park Cemetery, Inglewood, California.

Selected filmography

The People vs. John Doe (1916) - Mrs. Doe
The Price of Silence (1916) - Jenny Cupps
The Mysterious Mrs. M (1917) - Mrs. Musselwhite
The Terror (1917) - Mrs. Connelly
The Voice on the Wire (1917, Serial) - Pale Ida
The Flower of Doom (1917) - Arn Fun
The Hand That Rocks the Cradle (1917) - Sarah
The Flashlight (1917) - Mrs. Barclay
Pay Me! (1917) - Hilda Hendricks
Sirens of the Sea (1917) - Hadji
The Grand Passion (1918) - Boston Kate
The Two-Soul Woman (1918) - Leah
Danger, Go Slow (1918) - Miss Witherspoon (uncredited)
The Red Glove (1919) - Tiajuana
Uncharted Channels (1920) - Elsa Smolski
A Broadway Cowboy (1920) - Miss Howell
Seeds of Vengeance (1920) - Martha Ryerson
The Devil to Pay (1920) - Mrs. Roan
The Broken Gate (1920) - Julia Delafield
Devil Dog Dawson (1921)
Without Benefit of Clergy (1921) - Ameera's mother
The Devil Within (1921) - Witch
 Silver Spurs (1922) - Tehama
 The Half Breed (1922) - Mary
Thorns and Orange Blossoms (1922) - Fallie, Rosita's Maid
Omar the Tentmaker (1922) - Zarah
The Tiger's Claw (1923) - Azun
Snowdrift (1923) - Wananebish (prologue)
The Broken Wing (1924) - Quichita
Name the Man (1924) - Lisa Collister
Flapper Wives (1924) - Hulda
Poisoned Paradise: The Forbidden Story of Monte Carlo (1924) - Madame Tranquille
Mademoiselle Midnight (1924) - Chiquita
Romance Ranch (1924) - Tessa
A Cafe in Cairo (1924) - Batooka
The Prairie Pirate (1925) - Marie - Housekeeper (uncredited)
Lord Jim (1925) - Sultan's Wife (uncredited)
The Test of Donald Norton (1926) - Nee-tah-wee-gan
Hell-Bent for Heaven (1926) - Meg Hunt - Sid's Mother
Silken Shackles (1926) - Tade's Mother
The Silver Treasure (1926) - Mother Teresa
Flame of the Argentine (1926) - Nana
Into Her Kingdom (1926) - Stepan's Mother
The Country Beyond (1926) - Martha Leseur
Prisoners of the Storm (1926) - Lillian Nicholson
Rose of the Tenements (1926) - Sara Kaminsky
Camille (1926) - Camille's Mother
The King of Kings (1927) - (uncredited)
Wings (1927) - Dressing Room Attendant (uncredited)
The American (1927) (never-released widescreen film)
Eager Lips (1927)
Wild Geese (1927)
Eternal Love (1929)
The Mysterious Dr. Fu Manchu (1929)
Love Comes Along (1930)
Dangerous Paradise (1930)
The Return of Dr. Fu Manchu (1930)
 Desert Vengeance (1931)
Diamond Frontier (1940)
White Eagle (1941)

References

 Frederick, Maryland Post, Friday, October 17, 1913, Page 3.
 The New York Times, Evelyn Selbie, Actress, December 9, 1950, Page 15.
 Santa Fe New American, Veteran Movie Actress Dies, Friday, December 8, 1950, Page 12, Section A.

External links
 

 

Actresses from Louisville, Kentucky
American film actresses
American silent film actresses
Burials at Inglewood Park Cemetery
1871 births
1950 deaths
19th-century American actresses
American stage actresses
20th-century American actresses